Dorcadion skoupyorum is a species of beetle in the family Cerambycidae. It was described by Bernhauer and Peks in 2013. It is known from Turkey.

References

skoupyorum
Beetles described in 2013